Ian Michael Connell (born 17 February 1974) is a former Australian cricketer.  Connell was a right-handed batsman who bowled right-arm fast-medium.  He was born at Hobart, Tasmania.

Connell played a single List A match for Tasmania against England A in February 1993. He took the wickets of Paul Prichard and Dominic Cork for the cost of 47 runs from 11 overs, with Tasmania winning by 24 runs. He made no further appearances for Tasmania following this match.

See also
 List of Tasmanian representative cricketers

References

External links
Ian Connell at ESPNcricinfo
Ian Connell at CricketArchive

1974 births
Living people
Cricketers from Hobart
Australian cricketers
Tasmania cricketers